Glendive is a city in and the county seat of Dawson County, Montana, United States, and home to Dawson Community College. Glendive was established by the Northern Pacific Railway when they built the transcontinental railroad across the northern tier of the western United States from Minnesota to the Pacific Coast. The town of Glendive is an agricultural and ranching hub of eastern Montana sited between the Yellowstone River and the Badlands. Makoshika State Park is located just east of Glendive.

The population was 4,873 at the 2020 census.

History

Glendive was established by the Northern Pacific Railway during the building of the railroad line. The settlement mainly consisted of tents and log cabins until a building boom ensued with the arrival of first load of lumber in 1881.

The Montana territorial legislature created Dawson County in 1869 but did not name a county seat, instead placing it administratively under Meagher County. In 1881, Glendive citizens petitioned to name it the county seat.

In January 2015, Glendive was the site of a major oil spill from a pipeline which also contaminated drinking water.

Geography
The elevation of the city is 2,064 feet (629 m). Interstate 94 passes through town with access from exits 215, 224 and 231. Montana Highway 16 begins in West Glendive. The Yellowstone River cuts through town.

Climate
Glendive experiences a semi-arid climate (Köppen BSk) with long, cold, dry winters and hot, wetter summers. Together with Medicine Lake, the town holds the state's all-time-high record of 117 °F (47 °C), which was recorded on July 20, 1893, in Glendive and on July 5, 1937, in Medicine Lake. On June 29, 1961, an F4 tornado struck Glendive, causing between $500,000 and $5 million in damage.

Etymology
Sir George Gore, a wealthy Irish sportsman, named his favorite hunting area "Glendive" in 1855, from the Irish gleann 'valley' and dubh 'black'.

Demographics

Glendive was briefly an oil boom town after the discovery of oil in the Williston Basin in the early 1950s. Moving the oil out of the area was difficult and expensive though; the boom ended by 1954 and only a small reserve existed locally. The community has been impacted in the 2000s by the North Dakota oil boom which spurred a modest increase in the population.

2010 census
As of the census of 2010, there were 4,935 people, 2,060 households, and 1,190 families living in the city. The racial makeup of the city was 94.4% White, 0.5% African American, 2.4% Native American, 0.4% Asian, 0.1% Pacific Islander, 0.3% from other races, and 1.8% from two or more races. Hispanic or Latino of any race were 2.4% of the population.

There were 2,060 households, of which 25.8% had children under the age of 18 living with them, 45.4% were married couples living together, 8.3% had a female householder with no husband present, 4.1% had a male householder with no wife present, and 42.2% were non-families. 37.9% of all households were made up of individuals, and 17% had someone living alone who was 65 years of age or older. The average household size was 2.15 and the average family size was 2.84.

The median age in the city was 41.2 years. 19.9% of residents were under the age of 18; 12% were between the ages of 18 and 24; 22.7% were from 25 to 44; 26.5% were from 45 to 64; and 18.8% were 65 years of age or older. The gender makeup of the city was 50.4% male and 49.6% female.

2000 census
As of the census of 2000, there were 4,729 people, 1,983 households, and 1,229 families living in the city. The population density was 1,419.0 people per square mile (548.3/km2). There were 2,204 housing units at an average density of 661.4 per square mile (255.5/km2). The racial makeup of the city was 97.38% White, 0.30% African American,1.21% Native American, 0.11% Asian, 0.36% from other races, and 0.66% from two or more races. Hispanic or Latino of any race were 1.02% of the population.

There were 1,983 households, out of which 27.4% had children under the age of 18 living with them, 50.7% were married couples living together, 8.3% had a female householder with no husband present, and 38.0% were non-families. 34.2% of all households were made up of individuals, and 14.9% had someone living alone who was 65 years of age or older. The average household size was 2.22 and the average family size was 2.86.

In the city, the population was spread out, with 21.7% under the age of 18, 10.6% from 18 to 24, 23.3% from 25 to 44, 23.6% from 45 to 64, and 20.7% who were 65 years of age or older. The median age was 42 years. For every 100 females there were 92.5 males. For every 100 females age 18 and over, there were 91.6 males.

The median income for a household in the city was $30,943, and the median income for a family was $40,313. Males had a median income of $30,977 versus $20,132 for females. The per capita income for the city was $15,544. About 11.6% of families and 14.8% of the population were below the poverty line, including 17.8% of those under age 18 and 10.3% of those age 65 or over.

Education
Glendive Public Schools educates students from kindergarten through 12th grade. Dawson County High School's team name is the Red Devils.

Glendive is home to Dawson Community College, a 2-year college formed in 1940 to meet the educational needs of eastern Montana. The college offers Associate of Arts, Associate of Science, and Associate of Applied Science degrees as well as certificate programs. Dawson Community College is an open-access college.

Glendive Public Library serves the area.

Infrastructure
Dawson Community Airport is five miles northwest of Glendive.

Media

Glendive is the smallest US television market (or DMA), as identified by Nielsen.

The Glendive market has three local radio stations:
 KGLE AM 590
 KXGN AM 1400
 KDZN FM 96.5

Glendive is the smallest of the 210 designated markets for broadcast television in the United States as designated by Nielsen Media Research, with one station—KXGN channel 5—carrying a CBS affiliation along with state and local news broadcasts for a small potential audience of several thousand people (county population is 9,059). Until September 2009, KXGN also carried selected prime-time NBC programming in its schedule, making it the last "Big 3" affiliate to offer programming from more than one network on a single feed. In late June 2010, KXGN moved their NBC programming to a DT2 digital subchannel, rejoining the network.

K13PL channel 13, a translator (low-powered rebroadcaster) of Williston, North Dakota's NBC affiliate KUMV was also available until 2013; KUMV is still carried on area cable systems.

The Glendive Ranger-Review is the local paper.

Notable people
 Tim M. Babcock, 16th Governor of Montana, grew up on a ranch and later a house in Glendive, graduate of Dawson County High School in Glendive
 Kamran Ince, Turkish-American music composer
 Clyde Lamb, cartoonist
 John Patton, Wyoming state legislator
 Alfred E. Perlman, President, New York Central Railroad, President Western Pacific Railroad
 Mike Person, offensive lineman for the San Francisco 49ers
 Matt Rosendale, Montana State Auditor, 2018 Republican nominee for U.S. Senate in Montana, and U.S. Representative for Montana's at-large congressional district (2020–)
 Diana Thomas, mathematician and nutritionist
 Joyce Woodhouse, Democratic member of the Nevada Senate
 Hank Worden, born Norton Earl Worden, cowboy actor
Adam Morrison, NBA Basketball Player

See also
 Glendive Dinosaur and Fossil Museum
 Merrill Avenue Historic District (Glendive, Montana)

References

Further reading
"A Guide to Historic Glendive" Montana Historical Society (1998)

External links

 
 Glendive Chamber of Commerce
 Visit Glendive
 Dawson Community College
 Dawson Community Airport 

Cities in Dawson County, Montana
County seats in Montana
Cities in Montana